The Female: Seventy Times Seven is a 1962 Argentine drama film directed by Leopoldo Torre Nilsson starring Isabel Sarli. It was entered into the 1962 Cannes Film Festival.

Cast
 Isabel Sarli as Cora / Laura
 Francisco Rabal as Pascual / The Sheepherder
 Jardel Filho as Pedro / The Horsethief
 Blanca Lagrotta as The Mother
 Ignacio Finder as The Father
 Nelly Prono as The Duena
 Jacobo Finder
 Hilda Suárez
 Alberto Barcel
 Walter Santa Ana
 Juan Carlos Berisso
 Berta Ortegosa

US release
After 5 years, the film was picked up for distribution in the United States by Cambist Films. They re-edited the film and gave it a new name The Female with the director listed as Leo Towers. Sarli had refused to do nudity for this film, as she considered Torres Nilsson an "intellectual" director. But when the film was released in the US, scenes with a Sarli body double appeared nude. Sarli started a lawsuit against the distributors, but ended up losing since she continued to do nudes and did not damage her image. The film opened at Prudential's Tower Art in Milwaukee at Christmas 1967.

Reception
The film was one of the highest-grossing "sex art" films in the United States.

References

External links

1962 films
1962 drama films
Argentine black-and-white films
1960s Spanish-language films
Films directed by Leopoldo Torre Nilsson